Athletes from the Netherlands competed at the 1948 Winter Olympics in St. Moritz, Switzerland.

Speed skating

Men

References

Olympic Winter Games 1948, full results by sports-reference.com

Nations at the 1948 Winter Olympics
1948
Olympics